Huadu Railway Station is a railway station located in Huadu District, Guangzhou, Guangdong, China. It is located on the west side of Guangzhou North railway station and is used by Guangqing ICR, Guangzhou East Ring ICR. It opened on 30 November 2020. Passengers can get off at Guangzhou North Railway Station of Guangzhou Metro Line 9 to reach there.

References

Railway stations in Guangdong
Railway stations in China opened in 2020